Mu Arietis, Latinized from μ Arietis, is the Bayer designation for a star system in the northern constellation of Aries. It is approximately  distant from Earth, give or take a 30 light-year margin of error, and has a combined apparent visual magnitude of 5.74. According to the Bortle Dark-Sky Scale, this means it is faintly visible to the naked eye from dark suburban skies.

At the heart of this system is a close orbiting pair consisting of a magnitude 6.38 A-type main sequence star with a stellar classification of A0 Vp and a magnitude 8.38 F-type main sequence companion with a classification of F2 V. These two components have an angular separation of 0.04 arcseconds. A third component, consisting of a magnitude 6.72 star with a classification of A1 V, is orbiting the inner pair with a period of 8.845 years and an eccentricity of 0.34. A smaller fourth component, at an angular separation of 19.1 arcseconds, has a magnitude of 12.2.

References

External links
 HR 793
 CCDM J02424 +2001AP
 Image Mu Arietis

016811
012640
Arietis, Mu
Aries (constellation)
Arietis, 34
Spectroscopic binaries
A-type main-sequence stars
0793
Durchmusterung objects